Ships named Donetz have included the following:

, foundered in 1935 off Helsingfors, Finland
, transferred to Soviet Government in 1946 by the MOWT

Ship names